Michelle Magee (born 13 January 2000) is a Northern Ireland netball international and an Antrim ladies' Gaelic footballer. She was a member of the Northern Ireland teams at the 2018 Commonwealth Games and the 2019 Netball World Cup. Her older sister, Emma Magee, is also a Northern Ireland netball international and an Antrim ladies' Gaelic footballer.

Early life, family and education
Magee was educated at St. Dominic's Grammar School where she played both ladies' Gaelic football and netball. She was still a student at St Dominic's when she represented Northern Ireland at the 2018 Commonwealth Games. Her older sister, Emma Magee, is also a Northern Ireland netball international and an Antrim ladies' Gaelic footballer. Their father, Jim Magee, is an assistant manager/coach with the senior Antrim ladies' Gaelic football team.  Since 2018, Magee has attended Loughborough University.

Netball

Clubs
At club level Magee has played for Westside and Kingsway in Northern Ireland. While attending Loughborough University, Magee has played for Charnwood Rutland Warriors and Loughborough Lightning.

Northern Ireland
Magee represented Northern Ireland at under-17 and under-21 levels. She captained the under-17 team  and was a member of the under-21 squad at the 2017 Netball World Youth Cup. She was also a member of the senior Northern Ireland teams at the 2018 Commonwealth Games  and the 2019 Netball World Cup. Magee and her sister, Emma, belong to a group of senior Ladies' Gaelic footballers who also play netball for Northern Ireland. Others include Michelle Drayne (Antrim), Neamh Woods (Tyrone) and Caroline O'Hanlon (Armagh).

Gaelic games

Clubs
Magee has played ladies' Gaelic football at club level for St Brigids and Carryduff. In 2017 Michelle and Emma Magee were both members of the Carryduff team that won the Down Ladies' Senior Football Championship.

Inter-county
Michelle and Emma Magee have also represented Antrim in competitions such as the Ladies' National Football League and All-Ireland Junior Ladies' Football Championship. Michelle Magee also played camogie at under-14 level for Antrim.

References 

2000 births
Living people
Northern Ireland netball internationals
Netball players at the 2018 Commonwealth Games
Commonwealth Games competitors for Northern Ireland
2019 Netball World Cup players
Sportspeople from Belfast
Carryduff Gaelic footballers
Antrim ladies' Gaelic footballers
Antrim camogie players
Dual camogie–football players
People educated at St Dominic's Grammar School for Girls
Alumni of Loughborough University
Loughborough Lightning netball players